Somaiya Vidyavihar University is a private university located in the Vidyavihar suburb of Mumbai. It is the second largest campus in Mumbai, superseded only by the Powai campus of the Indian Institute of Technology.

The entire campus is owned and operated by the 'Somaiya Trust'. It is also has a sister campus in Sion, another suburb of Mumbai, called Somaiya Ayurvihar.

Colleges
It hosts a number of reputed educational institutions with country-wide recognition.

Some of the same are:
K.J. Somaiya Polytechnic Institute
K.J. Somaiya College of Arts & Commerce
K.J. Somaiya College of Science & Commerce
S.K. Somaiya College of Arts, Science & Commerce
K.J. Somaiya College of Engineering
K. J. Somaiya Institute of Management Studies and Research
K.J. Somaiya Junior College of Arts & Commerce
S.K. Somaiya Vinay Mandir

Apart from the above-mentioned colleges it has 45 different courses it offers to students, it also hosts The Somaiya School, a Central Board of Secondary Education affiliated school operated by the same educational trust. The campus also facilitates hostels for both boys and girls.

Somaiya Vidyavihar University 

On 26 August 2019, Somaiya Vidyavihar announced that it would be "the first ever private university in Mumbai". Apart from K.J. Somaiya College of Arts & Commerce, K.J. Somaiya College of Science & Commerce & S.K. Somaiya College of Arts, Science & Commerce, all the others would be included in the newly formed private university while these would retain their current status with the University of Mumbai. 

This means that K.J. Somaiya College of Arts & Commerce will still enjoy the 'autonomous' status which it has been granted earlier. While the other institutes, S.K. Somaiya College of Arts, Science & Commerce and K.J. Somaiya College of Science & Commerce, will remain as University of Mumbai affiliated institutes. These above mentioned chose to remain in the University of Mumbai because of the aid that they receive from it.

See also 
 List of Mumbai Colleges
K.J. Somaiya College of Engineering

References

External links 
 Somaiya Vidhyavihar (Official Website)
 K. J. Somaiya College of Engineering (Official Website)
 S.K.Somaiya College (Official Website)

Private universities in India
Universities and colleges in Maharashtra
Mumbai
2019 establishments in Maharashtra

Education in Mumbai
Universities and colleges in Mumbai
Colleges in India